Traffic were an English rock band formed in Birmingham  in April 1967 by Steve Winwood, Jim Capaldi, Chris Wood and Dave Mason. They began as a psychedelic rock group and diversified their sound through the use of instruments such as keyboards (such as the Mellotron and harpsichord), sitar, and various reed instruments, and by incorporating jazz and improvisational techniques in their music. 

The band had early success in the UK with their debut album Mr. Fantasy and non-album singles "Paper Sun", "Hole in My Shoe", and "Here We Go Round the Mulberry Bush," Their self-titled 1968 album was their most successful in Britain and featured one of their most popular songs, the widely covered "Feelin' Alright?" Dave Mason left the band shortly after the album's release, as did Steve Winwood the following year when he joined the supergroup Blind Faith, and Traffic effectively disbanded. An album compiled from studio and live recordings, Last Exit, was released in 1969.

By 1970, Blind Faith had also broken up and Winwood reunited with Chris Wood and Jim Capaldi in the process of recording a solo album, which led to Traffic reforming and the resulting album, John Barleycorn Must Die, serving as the band's comeback record. It became the band's biggest success in the United States to that point, reaching number 5. Their next LP, The Low Spark of High Heeled Boys (1971), went platinum in the US and became popular on FM radio, establishing Traffic as a leading progressive rock band. 1973's Shoot Out at the Fantasy Factory and 1974's When the Eagle Flies were further top 10 successes for the band in the US, and were both certified gold, though neither sold well in the UK. In 1974, the band broke up again.

A partial reunion, with Winwood and Capaldi alongside several new musicians, took place in 1994.  In the intervening years Steve Winwood had a successful solo career, with several hit singles and albums during the 1980s.  Dave Mason had his own solo career that produced a few minor hit songs in the 1970s, played as a session musician with a number of bands, and was briefly a member of Fleetwood Mac in 1995 and Ringo Starr & His All Starr Band in 1997.  Jim Capaldi also had some minor solo hits in the 1970s in his native UK but was less successful abroad.  During the 1990s, Capaldi primarily worked as a songwriter, working with Santana and The Eagles.  Chris Wood did sporadic session work after the breakup of Traffic in 1974, and died in 1983. Traffic were inducted into the Rock and Roll Hall of Fame in 2004.

History

Original lineup: 1967–69
Traffic's singer, keyboardist, and guitarist Steve Winwood was the lead singer for the Spencer Davis Group at age 14. The Spencer Davis Group released four Top Ten singles and three Top Ten albums in the United Kingdom, as well as two Top Ten singles in the United States. Drummer/vocalist/lyricist Jim Capaldi and guitarist Dave Mason had both been in the Hellions and Deep Feeling, while woodwinds player Chris Wood came out of Locomotive.

Winwood, Capaldi, Mason, and Wood met when they jammed together at The Elbow Room, a club in Aston, Birmingham. After Winwood left the Spencer Davis Group in April 1967, the quartet formed Traffic. Capaldi came up with the name of the group while the four of them were waiting to cross the street in Dorchester. Soon thereafter, they rented a cottage near the rural village of Aston Tirrold, Berkshire to write and rehearse new music.

Traffic signed to Chris Blackwell's Island Records label (where Winwood's elder brother Muff, also a member of the Spencer Davis Group, later became a record producer and executive), and their debut single "Paper Sun" became a UK hit in mid-1967 (#4 Canada). Their second single, Mason's psych-pop "Hole in My Shoe", was an even bigger hit (#4 Canada), and it became one of their best-known tracks. The band's third single, "Here We Go Round the Mulberry Bush", was made for the soundtrack of the 1967 British feature film of the same name. Their debut album was Mr. Fantasy, produced by Jimmy Miller, and like the singles, was a hit in the UK but not as big elsewhere, although it did reach number 88 in the US.

Mason left the group due to artistic differences just after Mr. Fantasy was released, but rejoined for a few months of 1968, long enough to contribute to a slim majority of the songs on their second album, Traffic. Released in 1968, it included the original version of Mason's "Feelin' Alright", which was later recorded with great success by Joe Cocker and Three Dog Night. Winwood, Wood, and Capaldi wanted to take the group in a different direction, opting for a folk/blues style rather than their earlier psychedelic/eclectic rock sound, while Mason was oriented towards psychedelic pop. Mason also cited discomfort with the Traffic lifestyle. The band toured the US as a trio in late 1968, which led to the following year's release of Traffic's next album, Last Exit, one side of which was recorded live. During 1968 Winwood and Wood often played with Jimi Hendrix, and they both appear on The Jimi Hendrix Experience's 1968 double album Electric Ladyland, as did an uncredited Mason.

The band was dissolved by Winwood's leaving in early 1969. His departure went unexplained at the time, even to Capaldi and Wood, but he later said "Because of the way I ended the Spencer Davis Group, I saw no reason why I shouldn't leave Traffic and move on. It seemed to me a normal thing to do." Winwood's comments clash with the fact that the Davis group continued after he left.

Winwood then formed the supergroup Blind Faith, which lasted less than a year, recording one album and undertaking one US tour. The remaining members of Traffic began a project with Mick Weaver (a.k.a. Wynder K. Frog), the short-lived Mason, Capaldi, Wood and Frog (later shortened to Wooden Frog), they played a few live dates and recorded some BBC sessions, but broke up before releasing any formal recordings.

Later lineups: 1970–74
After the break-up of Blind Faith in 1969, Winwood began working on a solo recording, bringing in Wood and Capaldi to contribute, and the project eventually turned into a new Traffic album, John Barleycorn Must Die, their most successful album yet. Traffic went on to expand its lineup late in 1970, adding Winwood's former Blind Faith bandmate Ric Grech on bass. After Capaldi lost his infant son to cot death, he stopped drumming and nearly left the band, resulting in an expanded lineup with drummer Jim Gordon of Derek and the Dominos and Ghanaian percussionist Rebop Kwaku Baah in 1971.  The live album Welcome to the Canteen was released in September and marked the band's break with United Artists Records.  It did not bear the "Traffic" name on the cover; the album was credited to the band's individual members (including Mason, who returned for his third and final spell with the band). However, the band logo did appear on the back cover. The album ended with a version of The Spencer Davis Group song "Gimme Some Loving", which became a minor hit.

Following the departure of Mason, Traffic released The Low Spark of High Heeled Boys (1971), which was a Top 10 American album but did not chart in the UK. It sold over half a million copies in 1972 when it received a gold disc, and was awarded a R.I.A.A. platinum disc in March 1976 for over a million total sales. Once again, however, personnel problems wracked the band as Grech and Gordon were fired in December 1971 due to excessive drug use, and the month after, Winwood's struggles with peritonitis brought Traffic to a standstill. Jim Capaldi used this hiatus to record a solo album, Oh How We Danced, which proved to be the beginning of a long and successful solo career. The album included a surplus recording from The Low Spark of High-Heeled Boys, "Open Your Heart", and the new tracks featured drummer Roger Hawkins and bassist David Hood, from the Muscle Shoals Sound Studio house band. Capaldi soon brought them on board to replace Grech and Gordon.

The new lineup (Winwood, Capaldi, Wood, Kwaku Baah, Hawkins, Hood) toured America in early 1972 to promote the LP, and their concert at the Santa Monica Civic Auditorium on 21 February was recorded in multitrack audio and captured on colour videotape with multiple cameras. The 64-minute performance is thought to be the only extended live footage of the group. It was evidently not broadcast on television at the time, but was later released on home video and DVD.

Following Winwood's recovery from peritonitis, Traffic's sixth studio album, Shoot Out at the Fantasy Factory, released in 1973, met with a cold critical reception, but in sales it was another major hit. It was shortly followed by a major world tour, for which Muscle Shoals keyboardist Barry Beckett was added to the lineup.  The double live album On the Road was drawn from this tour. It broke the band's string of British flops by reaching number 40 in the UK Albums Chart. However, after the tour Winwood informed the Muscle Shoals trio that he was returning to a smaller lineup more like their original one, and their services were no longer needed. Meanwhile, Chris Wood's problems with drug use and depression were increasing.

Rosko Gee was recruited on bass, while Capaldi switched back to drums. The resulting quintet began to record a new album in late 1973, but Kwaku Baah was fired partway through the sessions, leaving most of the album to be recorded by the quartet of Winwood, Capaldi, Wood, and Gee.  When the Eagle Flies, released in 1974, was yet another Top Ten album in the US, and moderately successful in the UK. However, a subsequent tour of the US, while successful in terms of ticket sales, was emotionally exhausting for the band. Capaldi later recalled "Rosko Gee and I were the only ones in anything like normal shape. Steve was having recurrent problems with the peritonitis, and Chris's body was suffering from chemical warfare." Winwood ultimately passed his boiling point, walking off the stage in the middle of what turned out to be the band's final show, in Chicago. The following day he left the tour without a word to anyone, leaving the rest of the band waiting for him at the venue for that night's scheduled performance. Feeling Winwood had been integral to Traffic's music, the remaining members opted not to continue the band without him.

Traffic's break-up was followed by two compilations from United Artists (Heavy Traffic and More Heavy Traffic), both of which only drew from the first half of their output.

Steve Winwood embarked on a solo career, while Rosko Gee and Rebop Kwaku Baah joined German band Can. Kwaku Baah died on stage from a cerebral hemorrhage in Stockholm, Sweden in 1983, and Capaldi dedicated his solo album Fierce Heart to his memory. Chris Wood also died that year from pneumonia.

Reunion

All the still living members of Traffic's most recent lineup reunited in 1994 for a one-off tour, after a fan left a voice mail message at Bob Weir's (of the Grateful Dead) hotel in Chicago during the 1992 "Scaring the Children" tour, and suggested it would be cool if Traffic toured with the (then Grateful) Dead. Traffic opened for the Grateful Dead during their summer tour.  The flute/sax role on the tour was played by Randall Bramblett, who had worked extensively with Steve Winwood. Mike McEvoy joined the line up playing keyboards, guitar and viola, and Walfredo Reyes, Jr. played drums and percussion. Winwood and Capaldi recorded and released a new Traffic album, Far from Home, with no involvement from the other four members. It broke the top 40 in both the UK and USA. The Last Great Traffic Jam, a double live album and DVD released in 2005, documents the band's 1994 reunion tour.

The four original members of Traffic were inducted for their contributions in the Rock and Roll Hall of Fame on 15 March 2004. Winwood, Capaldi, Mason, and Stephanie Wood (standing in for her late brother Chris) all attended the ceremony. Winwood and Capaldi took part in the induction performance, but were joined by Dave Mason performing his song 'Feelin' Alright' for the grand finale which also featured Keith Richards, Tom Petty, and the Temptations. The induction lineup was completed by Bramblett on organ and bass pedals, even though he was not one of the members inducted.

Tentative plans for another Traffic project were cut short by Jim Capaldi's death from stomach cancer at age 60 in January 2005, ending the songwriting partnership with Winwood that had fueled Traffic from its beginning. Winwood subsequently dedicated The Last Great Traffic Jam "to the man without whom Traffic could never be: my lifelong friend and partner, Jim Capaldi."

Dear Mr. Fantasy was a celebration for Capaldi that took place at The Roundhouse in Camden Town, London on 21 January 2007. Guests included Steve Winwood, Paul Weller, Pete Townshend, and many more. Dear Mr. Fantasy featured the music of Jim Capaldi and Traffic, and all profits went to The Jubilee Action Street Children Appeal.

Members

Timeline

Discography

Studio albums

 Mr. Fantasy (first US pressing issued with title Heaven Is In Your Mind and released as Reaping in Canada) – 1967
 Traffic – 1968
 Last Exit (side 1 only) – 1969
 John Barleycorn Must Die – 1970
 The Low Spark of High Heeled Boys – 1971
 Shoot Out at the Fantasy Factory – 1973
 When the Eagle Flies – 1974
 Far from Home  – 1994

Live albums
 Last Exit (side 2 recorded at The Fillmore) – 1969
 Welcome to the Canteen − 1971   (Recorded live in London) 
 On The Road – 1973  (Recorded live on tour in Germany)  
 Last Great Traffic Jam – 2005

References

External links

 Traffic at AllMusic
 BrumBeat Traffic information
 Official press release for John Barleycorn Must Die reissue
 
 

1967 establishments in England
1974 disestablishments in England
 
English progressive rock groups
English psychedelic rock music groups
Musical groups established in 1967
Musical groups disestablished in 1974
Musical groups from Birmingham, West Midlands